Kristina Đukić (25 July 2000 – 8 December 2021), better known by her alias Kika (stylised as K1KA), was a Serbian YouTuber and livestreamer.

Born in Belgrade in 2000, Kika began her YouTube career in 2015. Initially, she had recorded content related to Minecraft, but later moved on to Grand Theft Auto V, Counter-Strike: Global Offensive, and League of Legends. She was involved in an online drama with Baka Prase in 2019, which received national attention, and was later a target of cyberbullying. Kika's death was announced to the public on 9 December 2021; it raised suspicion that she had committed suicide, although her mother and Baka Prase had claimed that she was allegedly the subject of a murder.

Internet career 
Kika launched her channel in March 2015 where she began posting Minecraft content. Considering that she was one of the few Serbian female youtubers at that time, she managed to gather attention and in less than a month, she had reached thousand subscribers. At some point of time, her channel was the fastest-growing in the Balkans region, and in less than a year she gathered 50,000 subscribers. She later expanded her career into Grand Theft Auto V and Counter-Strike: Global Offensive, which brought her more popularity. Kika had also recorded reaction videos and Vlogs. A number of her videos had also reached a couple of million views; the videos were not gaming-related. Kika later also launched a Twitch account, where she mainly livestreamed League of Legends. She had published her only music video in 2019. Kika was also involved in esports, and was known for her skills in Counter-Strike: Global Offensive; she had also participated in tournaments in the game. She was also a part of multiple esports organisations.

Kika had received national attention after being involved in an online drama with Baka Prase, a Serbian YouTuber, in 2019. Both of them had also argued in a television show which was aired on Prva. Shortly after, Kika became a target of cyberbullying by Baka Prase and his followers, which allegedly worsened her mental health.

Personal life 
Kika was born on 25 July 2000 in Belgrade, where she finished primary school. She enrolled in an engineering class in the Belgrade Trade School. Kika was offered to take part in the Sinđelići television series, although she declined the offer; she later stated that "rejecting the role was the worst move in my career".

Death 
On 9 December 2021, it was revealed to the public that Kika had died the previous day. Although not revealed at first, the police confirmed that her body was found around 11:40 pm in her apartment, including medication, which raised suspicion that she committed suicide. Her funeral was held on 14 December. In July 2022, the Public Court had concluded that her death was caused by an overdose of MDMA and bromazepam. In a 23 July video, Kika's mother had claimed that Kika was murdered. She had also noted that Kika's farewell letter was written by an unknown person at her computer a day after her death. Baka Prase had later published a video in which he agreed with Kika's mother and stated a similar theory regarding her death.

Due to her involvement in the drama that took place in 2019, Baka Prase was subsequently detained and sent to questioning. He was later released on the same day. Due to her death, Baka Prase moved temporarily to the Netherlands. The Independent Association of Journalists of Serbia (NUNS) had strongly condemned the "shameful reporting about the person who committed suicide" and stated that many media tabloids allegedly violated the Code of Journalists of Serbia.

See also
List of unsolved deaths

References

2000 births
2021 suicides
Bullying and suicide
People from Belgrade
Serbian YouTubers
Suicides in Serbia
Twitch (service) streamers
Unsolved deaths
Victims of cyberbullying